Little Terrible Creek is a  long 2nd order tributary to Terrible Creek in Halifax County, Virginia.

Course 
Little Terrible Creek rises at Catawba, Virginia in Halifax County and then flows south to join Terrible Creek about 4 miles southwest of Crystal Hill.

Watershed 
Little Terrible Creek drains  of area, receives about 45.6 in/year of precipitation, has a wetness index of 406.59, and is about 56% forested.

See also 
 List of Virginia Rivers

References 

Rivers of Halifax County, Virginia
Rivers of Virginia